Marianne von Willemer (born 20 November 1784, probably in Linz; died 6 December 1860 in Frankfurt am Main; probably born as Marianne Pirngruber; also known as Marianne Jung) was an Austrian actress and dancer best known for her relationship with Johann Wolfgang von Goethe and her appearance in his poetry.

Biography
At the age of 14 she moved to Frankfurt am Main, where she became the third wife of Frankfurt banker Johann Jakob von Willemer. He introduced her to Goethe, who met Marianne in 1814 and 1815. Goethe immortalised her in the Buch Suleika of his late work West-östlicher Divan; she later revealed that several of its poems were authored by her.

References

1784 births
1860 deaths
Austrian stage actresses
Austrian female dancers
Austrian dancers
Actors from Linz
19th-century Austrian actresses
19th-century Austrian women writers
Johann Wolfgang von Goethe
Burials at Frankfurt Main Cemetery
19th-century Austrian dancers